Potrčulka (Macedonian: Потрчулка; English: Hurrying dance) is a traditional Macedonian Oro, folk dance, from the town of Kočani.

It is a woman dance with medium fast movements, small steps and small jumps on half feet. The dancers are holding their belts with left hand over the right one and begin their dance in a position of a half circle. The dance rhythm is 2/4.

See also
Music of North Macedonia

Further reading
Dimovski, Mihailo. (1977:75-9). Macedonian folk dances (Original in Macedonian: Македонски народни ора). Skopje: Naša kniga & Institut za folklor

External links
 The notes of Potrčulka

Macedonian dances